Fujimori (written:) is a Japanese surname. Notable people with the surname include:
, Former Peruvian president and politician
, Japanese printmaker
, Japanese swimmer
, Japanese engineer
, Peruvian businesswoman and politician, daughter of Alberto Fujimori
, Peruvian businessman and politician, son of Alberto Fujimori
, Japanese water polo player
, Japanese shogi player
, Japanese footballer
Santiago Fujimori (born 1946), Peruvian lawyer and politician, brother of Alberto Fujimori
, Grand Steward of the Imperial Household Agency
, Japanese architect and architectural historian
, Japanese shogi player
, Japanese businessman
, Japanese hurdler
, Japanese snowboarder

Fictional characters
, a character in the manga series Angelic Layer
, a character in the manga series Hungry Heart: Wild Striker
, a character in the video game Way of the Samurai 3
, a character in the visual novel Suki na Mono wa Suki Dakara Shōganai!
, a character in the video game Revelations: Persona

See also
8387 Fujimori, a main-belt asteroid

Japanese-language surnames